This article is about the particular significance of the year 1962 to Wales and its people.

Incumbents

Archbishop of Wales – Edwin Morris, Bishop of Monmouth
Archdruid of the National Eisteddfod of Wales – Trefin

Events
January–April – An outbreak of smallpox spreading from Cardiff infects 45 people and kills 19 in south Wales; 900,000 people in the region are vaccinated against the disease.
12 April – Nine miners are killed and nine injured in an accident at Tower Colliery, Hirwaun, Wales.
15 May – Emlyn Hooson wins the Montgomeryshire by-election brought about by the death of Clement Davies.  In the run-up to the by-election, the "Elvis Rock" is painted with the graffiti "Elis" by supporters of Plaid Cymru candidate Islwyn Ffowc Elis.
20 July – The world's first regular passenger hovercraft service is introduced between Rhyl and Wallasey.
4 August – Cymdeithas yr Iaith Gymraeg, the Welsh Language Society, is founded.
September – Ysgol Gyfun Rhydfelen, the first Welsh-medium secondary school in south Wales, opens its doors.
19 September – Atlantic College opens its doors for the first time at St Donat's Castle, marking the birth of the pioneering United World College educational movement.
26 October – Richard Thomas and Baldwins's new steelworks at Llanwern near Newport, is officially opened by Queen Elizabeth II of the United Kingdom.
28 October – Chepstow Railway Bridge rebuilding completed.
date unknown 
Richard Booth opens his first second-hand bookshop at the old fire station in Hay-on-Wye.
Cardiff Zoo opened.

Arts and literature
21 March – Actress Rachel Roberts marries Rex Harrison in Genoa.
Welsh National Opera launches a training scheme for singers.
Dick Francis publishes his first thriller, Dead Cert.

Awards
National Eisteddfod of Wales (held in Llanelli)
National Eisteddfod of Wales: Chair – Caradog Prichard, "Llef un yn Llefain"
National Eisteddfod of Wales: Crown – D. Emlyn Lewis, Y Cwmwl
National Eisteddfod of Wales: Prose Medal – William Owen, Bu Farw Ezra Bebb

New books
Clifford Dyment – The Railway Game
John Roberts Evans – Ar Drothwy'r Nos
William Evans (Wil Ifan) – Colofnau Wil Ifan
Michael Foot – Aneurin Bevan, vol. 1
Menna Gallie – The Small Mine
Llewelyn Wyn Griffith – The Adventures of Pryderi
Oxford Book of Welsh Verse
Gwyn Thomas – Chwerwder yn y Ffynhonnau
Norman Thomas – Ask at the Unicorn
Raymond Williams – Communications

Music
Dilys Elwyn-Edwards – Caneuon y Tri Aderyn
Alun Hoddinott – Folksong Suite
William Mathias – Postlude
Grace Williams – Four Medieval Welsh Poems for alto, harp and harpsichord
David Wynne – Cymric Rhapsodies

Film
Richard Burton and Donald Houston appear in The Longest Day.
Peter Greenaway makes his first film: Death of Sentiment.
Jack Howells makes the short documentary Dylan Thomas featuring Richard Burton.

Broadcasting

Welsh-language radio
13 February – Saunders Lewis gives the Welsh Home Service’s Annual Lecture, entitled Tynged yr Iaith (The Fate of the Language).

Television
14 September – The first transmitter, at Preseli, of the Teledu Cymru – Wales (West and North) Television service comes on air.

English-language television
17 September – First edition of the Welsh national news programme BBC Wales Today.

Sport

Football – John Charles returns to Leeds United from several years playing for Italian clubs.
Golf – Brian Huggett wins the Dutch Open championship.
BBC Wales Sports Personality of the Year – Ivor Allchurch

Births
5 January – Geraint Williams, footballer
11 January – Chris Bryant, politician
16 January – Bethan Gwanas, Welsh-language writer
25 May - Martin Goldsmith, footballer
27 June – Michael Ball, singer
22 August – Iolo Williams, naturalist and TV presenter
28 August – David Melding, politician
15 September – Kevin Allen, actor, comedian and film director
22 July – Arthur Emyr, rugby player and television presenter and executive
22 August – Iolo Williams, naturalist and broadcaster
5 September – Peter Wingfield, actor
15 October – Mark Ring, rugby player
24 October – Jonathan Davies, rugby player
11 November - Chris Sander, footballer
12 December – John Jones, record producer
31 December – Chris Hallam, wheelchair athlete
date unknown
Fiona Bennett, composer
Sioned Wiliam, broadcaster, writer and producer

Deaths
18 January – Iolo Aneurin Williams, journalist, author and politician, 71
26 January – George Jeffreys, founder of the Elim Pentecostal Church, 72
11 February – John Edward Daniel, theologian, chairman of Plaid Cymru, 59 (road accident)
14 February – Ezer Griffiths, physicist, 73
27 February – Albert Rhys Williams, Welsh-American journalist, labour organiser, and publicist, 78
23 March – Clement Davies, politician, 80
April – Edgar Morgan, rugby union player, 80
25 April – Herbie Baxter, Glamorgan cricketer, 79
30 April – Charles Williams, Anglican priest and academic, 55
11 May – Eliot Crawshay-Williams, politician and author, 82
16 June – Edgar Rees Jones, barrister and politician, 83
24 June – Thomas Richards, historian, 84
3 August - Edgar Phillips, poet and Archdruid of the National Eisteddfod, 72
23 August - Robert Bye, VC recipient, 72
23 September - Margaret Jane Gordon (Lady Gordon), singer, 82
5 November (in London) – Percy Cudlipp, journalist, 56
30 November – Lewis Pugh Evans, Victoria Cross recipient, 81
15 December – Charles Rhys, 8th Baron Dynevor, politician, 63
17 December – Lonza Bowdler, Wales international rugby player, 61
21 December – Gary Hocking, motorcycle road racer, 25 (racing accident)

See also
1962 in Northern Ireland

References

Wales